Bhagot is a village in the Punjab province of Pakistan. It is located in Sialkot District.

References

Villages in Sialkot District